HNoMS Uthaug (S304) may refer to one of the following submarines of the Royal Norwegian Navy: